Sahak may refer to:
 Sahak-e Abd ol Nabi
 Sahak-e Yareyeh
 Sahak Parparyan
 Sahak III Bagratuni
 Sahak of Armenia
 Ashot-Sahak of Vaspurakan

Fictional characters
Sahak, a supporting character from the novel Barabbas.